The SC Neuenheim is a German rugby union club from Heidelberg, currently playing in the Rugby-Bundesliga. Having won nine men's and twelve women's German championships as of 2013, the club is one of the most accomplished in Germany.

History
Formed in 1902, the club is the second-oldest rugby club in Heidelberg, one of the two centres of German rugby (the other being Hannover). Fußballclub Heidelberg-Neuenheim, the club's original name, was formed in the Neuenheim suburb of Heidelberg. Their first two titles were achieved still under this name, including winning its first German championship in 1912.

In 1923, the club changed its name to SC Neuenheim since the term football club did not reflect its orientation any more.

The club developed to become the most victorious rugby club in Heidelberg, collecting a large number of titles in men's and women's rugby. It prides itself as the biggest rugby club in Germany in regards to membership.

With the interception of the Rugby-Bundesliga in 1971, SCN fell behind other clubs, especially the strong clubs from Hannover. After 28 years without a championship, the club pulled off a surprise win over TSV Victoria Linden in the 1995 final, beating the favourite 14-13 in extra time.

Another surprise championship came in 2003, when DRC Hannover, winner of the previous five championships, could be beaten 18-6. The year after the club won its last men's championship to date, defeating DRC once more.

In 2006, in the first ever all-Heidelberg final, it lost to RG Heidelberg 9-13.

In 2007, it finished fourth in the league, three points outside the finals ranks. The season after, only a fifth place could be achieved and the SCN was well clear of the top-two positions in points.

The club improved in 2008-09, having hired a new coach for this purpose, finishing third in the league and reaching the semi-finals in the championship, where it went out to Heidelberger RK in extra time. It took until 2011-12 to finish in the top four again and reach the post season. The club was however outclassed in its semi-final and lost 71-21 to regular season champions Heidelberger RK. At the end of the season the contract with coach Mark Kuhlmann was not extended.

SCN finished first in their group in the 2012-13 season and qualified for the south/west division of the championship round, where it also came first. The club advanced to the German championship final where it lost 41-10 to Heidelberger RK. In 2013–14 the team qualified for the championship and the play-offs once more, losing to DSV 78 Hannover in the quarter finals.

In the 2014–15 season the club finished third in the south-west championship group and was knocked out by TV Pforzheim in the semi finals of the play-offs after a victories over Hamburger RC and DSV 78 Hannover.

Its reserve side joint with Heidelberger TV in the 2nd Bundesliga to form SG Heidelberger TV/SC Neuenheim II for 2008-09. Since 2009-10 the reserve side played in the Regional League.

Club honours

Men
 German rugby union championship
 Champions: 1912, 1921, 1924, 1949, 1966, 1967, 1995, 2003, 2004
 Runners up: 1914, 1923, 1936, 1939, 1950, 1951, 1954, 1958, 1961, 1962, 1972, 1990, 2001, 2006, 2013
 German rugby union cup
 Winner: 1964, 1975, 1988, 1994, 1999, 2001, 2016
 Runners up: 1991, 1992, 1995, 1998, 2002, 2010
 German sevens championship
 Champions: 1996
 Runners up: 1997, 1998, 2010

Women
 German rugby union championship
 Champions: 1988, 1989, 1990 1991, 1992, 1993, 1996, 1997, 1998, 1999, 2004, 2009
 Runners up: 1994, 1995, 2000, 2001, 2005, 2008, 2010, 2011, 2013, 2014, 2015, 2016
 German sevens championship
 Champions: 2007, 2014
 Runners up: 2003, 2004, 2005, 2008, 2009, 2010, 2012, 2013

Men - Recent seasons
Recent seasons of the club:

 Until 2001, when the single-division Bundesliga was established, the season was divided in autumn and spring, a Vorrunde and Endrunde, whereby the top teams of the Rugby-Bundesliga would play out the championship while the bottom teams together with the autumn 2nd Bundesliga champion would play for Bundesliga qualification. The remainder of the 2nd Bundesliga teams would play a spring round to determine the relegated clubs. Where two placing's are shown, the first is autumn, the second spring. In 2012 the Bundesliga was expanded from ten to 24 teams and the 2nd Bundesliga from 20 to 24  with the leagues divided into four regional divisions.

Rugby internationals
In Germany's 2006–08 European Nations Cup campaign, Lars Eckert, Marten Strauch, Klaus Mainzer, Marcus Trick, Steve Williams, Christian Hug and Michael Kerr were called up for the national team.

In the 2008–10 campaign, Eckert, Strauch and Trick all appeared for the SCN and Germany again, while Udo Schwarz, Shalva Didebashvili and Christian Baracat were new additions to the club's list of internationals.

In the 2010–12 campaign, only Marten Strauch and Lars Eckert were selected to play for Germany.

For the opening match of the 2012–14 edition of the ENC against the Ukraine the club had only Lars Eckert re-selected for the team while Pascal Drügemöller was a new edition to the club's list of German internationals.

The club had one player selected for the German under-18 team at the 2009 European Under-18 Rugby Union Championship, Pascal Drügemöller. Drügemöller also played at the 2010 tournament.

Women - Recent seasons

References

External links
  Official website
 SC Neuenheim team info at totalrugby.de
 Tables and results of German rugby on rugbyweb.de
  SC Neuenheim at totalrugby.de

German rugby union clubs
Rugby clubs established in 1902
Rugby union in Heidelberg
1902 establishments in Germany